Pressure Sensitive is the debut album by American saxophonist Ronnie Laws released in 1975 by Blue Note. The album reached No. 25 on the Billboard Top Soul Albums chart.

Overview
Pressure Sensitive was produced by George Butler and Wayne Henderson of The Crusaders.

Reception
The AllMusic review by Scott Yanow awarded the album 4½ stars and stated, "this obviously commercial effort (every song fades out before it hits the five-minute mark) can only be recommended in comparison to Ronnie Laws's later more inferior recordings".

Track listing

Personnel
Ronnie Laws - tenor saxophone, soprano saxophone, flute
Jerry Peters - electric piano, synthesizer
Mike Cavanaugh, Joe Sample - clavinet, electric piano
Roland Bautista - guitar
John Rowin - guitar (tracks 2, 3 & 5)
Wilton Felder (track 6), Clint Mosley (tracks 1-5, 7 & 8) - electric bass
Steve Guttierez (tracks 1-5, 7 & 8), Michael Willars (track 6) - drums
Joe Clayton - conga, tambourine, flexatone (track 1)
Side Effect - backing vocals (track 2)

References

Blue Note Records albums
Ronnie Laws albums
1975 debut albums
Albums produced by George Butler (record producer)
Albums produced by Wayne Henderson (musician)
Reissue albums